Ariel Rebecca Martin (born November 22, 2000), known professionally as Baby Ariel, is an American social media personality known for her videos on the social media platform musical.ly (now known as TikTok). She was recognized as one of the most influential people on the Internet by Time magazine in 2017, and she was featured on Forbes 2017 list of top entertainment influencers.<ref name="forbes">"Top Influencers of 2017: Entertainment". ''Forbes. Retrieved December 29, 2017.</ref>

Ariel is known for her social media work, particularly her work on the social media platform TikTok, and for starring as Wynter Barkowitz in the Disney Channel Original Movie movie Zombies 2. She has over 36.1 million TikTok followers, 10.7 million Instagram followers, 2.93 million YouTube subscribers, and 1.1 million Twitter followers. She won the Teen Choice Award for "Choice Muser" in 2016 and 2017.

Career
Ariel began her career as a creator on musical.ly in 2015, downloading the app out of boredom. In 2015, Ariel launched an anti-bullying campaign called #ArielMovement, described by BlackBook as one of her most important endeavors. People magazine recognized her for her support in the #HackHarassment initiative to stop Internet trolls and negativity on the Internet.

In 2016, Ariel was featured on the cover of Billboard magazine alongside fellow Musical.ly personality Jacob Sartorius. She has appeared on 60 Minutes and Good Morning America and has been cited as a top influencer by Forbes,"What Is a Social Media Influencer? - The Business of Influence, Ep. 1". Forbes. People, and USA Today. Ariel signed with Creative Artists Agency in September 2016 and released her debut single "Aww" on December 1, 2017."Baby Ariel | Album Discography". AllMusic. She released her second single "Perf" on January 17, 2018.

On March 30, 2018, Ariel released the song "Say It" with Daniel Skye. She collaborated with EA Games for The Sims 4, appearing as a Sim in the expansion pack The Sims 4: Get Famous, released in November 2018. In late 2018, Ariel starred in Baby Doll Records, a mini-series on Brat. In 2019, she starred in Bixler High Private Eye, a  Nickelodeon television film. Later that year, it was announced that she would be appearing in the Disney Channel film Zombies 2, and would portray the role of Wynter.

Ariel was profiled in Fast Company,"The Social Mediators: 7 Young Social Stars Share Their Rules For Engagement". Fast Company. October 17, 2016. Business Insider, and Seventeen Magazine. Other mentions include CNN, Rolling Stone, Huffington Post, Tubefilter, Paper Magazine, RAW, and Wonderwall.

Ariel released her debut EP “blue” on July 9, 2021.

Personal life
Martin is Jewish and was born in Pembroke Pines, Florida, to a Panamanian father and Cuban-Israeli mother.

Discography
Singles

blue EP

FilmographyTelevision Film'''

Music videos

Awards and nominations
Ariel won the Teen Choice Award for "Choice Muser" in 2016 and 2017. She was also nominated for "Breakout Creator" and "Entertainer of the Year" at the 2016 Streamy Awards. In 2017, she was nominated for "Favorite Social Media Star" at the People's Choice Awards, "Social Star Award" at the iHeartRadio Music Awards, "Muser of the Year" at the Shorty Awards, and "Favorite Influencer" at the Premios Tu Mundo.

References

External links
 
 
 

2000 births
21st-century American women singers
21st-century American actresses
American child actresses
American child singers
American TikTokers
American people of Panamanian descent
American women bloggers
American bloggers
YouTubers from Florida
Anti-bullying activists
Lifestyle YouTubers
Living people
People from Pembroke Pines, Florida
Women video bloggers
American people of Israeli descent
American people of Cuban-Jewish descent
Hispanic and Latino American women singers
Hispanic and Latino American actresses
Jewish American actresses
Actresses from Florida
American entertainers of Cuban descent
American musicians of Cuban descent
21st-century American Jews